The Astronomer may refer to:

 Vita Hludovici or the "Limousin Astronomer", the anonymous author of the Vita Hludovici, a biography of Holy Roman Emperor Louis the Pious
 The Astronomer (Vermeer), a 1668 oil painting by the 17th century Dutch painter Johannes Vermeer